Yevgeny Anatolyevich Dadonov (born 12 March 1989) is a Russian professional ice hockey player for the Dallas Stars of the National Hockey League (NHL). He previously played in two stints for the Florida Panthers where he was originally selected 71st overall in the 2007 NHL Entry Draft, as well as the Ottawa Senators, Vegas Golden Knights and Montreal Canadiens.

Playing career
Dadonov played for Traktor Chelyabinsk in the RSL and KHL. He was drafted 71st overall by the Florida Panthers in the 2007 NHL Entry Draft and joined the team in 2009, playing a season with their American Hockey League (AHL) affiliate, the Rochester Americans.

North America
Dadonov scored his first NHL goal on 15 December 2010 against Cam Ward of the Carolina Hurricanes. In January 2011 Dadonov was selected to participate in the 2011 NHL All-Star Game SuperSkills Competition as one of 12 rookies.

In the 2011–12 season, the last year of his entry-level contract, after failing to gain a regular position into the Panthers line-up on 18 January 2012, Dadonov was traded, along with A.J. Jenks, by the Panthers to the Carolina Hurricanes in exchange for Jonathan Matsumoto and Mattias Lindstrom. Dadonov was assigned to the Hurricanes' affiliate, the Charlotte Checkers where he played the remainder of the season out.

Donbass
On 7 July 2012, Dadonov left the Hurricanes and North America to return to the KHL with Donbass. In December 2013 he signed a three-year extension with the club, and expressed interest in acquiring Ukrainian citizenship. With Donbass, Dadonov won the 2012–13 IIHF Continental Cup, and became the second scoring leader of the tournament. In the 2013–14 KHL season Dadonov helped Donbass reach the Conference Semifinals.

SKA Saint Petersburg
With HC Donbass suspending operations due to the outbreak of War in Donbass Dadonov signed a multi-year contract with KHL club SKA Saint Petersburg on 11 June 2014.

In 2015, Dadonov played a vital role in helping SKA Saint Petersburg to win the Gagarin Cup for the first time. When team captain Ilya Kovalchuk was named MVP of the season, he refused to accept it and instead passed the award on to Dadonov. In a later interview, Kovalchuk said that he felt Dadonov deserved the award more. At the end of the season, the KHL named Dadonov one of the two winners of the "Gentleman on Ice" award for his fair play and sportsmanship.

Return to Florida Panthers
Having evolved and matured his game over the previous five seasons spent in the KHL, Dadonov opted to pursue a return for a second attempt in the NHL. With his rights having expired from the Hurricanes, Dadonov returned to his original club, the Florida Panthers, in agreeing to a three-year, $12 million contract on 1 July 2017.

Ottawa Senators
After three productive seasons with the Panthers, Dadonov left the club as a free agent, to sign a three-year, $15 million contract with the Ottawa Senators on 15 October 2020. Dadonov saw his production drop in his first season after signing with the Senators compared to his time in Florida, putting up 20 points in 55 games, under half a point-per-game average. He only spent the 2020–21 season with the Senators before being traded to the Vegas Golden Knights during the subsequent off-season.

Vegas Golden Knights
After a disappointing first season with the Senators, Dadonov was traded to the Vegas Golden Knights in exchange for Nick Holden and a 2022 3rd-round draft pick on 28 July 2021. 

During the 2021–22 season, the Golden Knights attempted to trade both Dadonov and a conditional second-round pick to the Anaheim Ducks in exchange for John Moore and Ryan Kesler at the NHL trade deadline on 21 March 2022, in order to alleviate salary cap constraints caused by the acquisition of star forward Jack Eichel from the Buffalo Sabres. The deal immediately came into question due to a no-trade clause in Dadonov's contract. A report the same day stated the Golden Knights claimed the Senators did not inform them of the no-trade clause, and the NHL's central registry processed the trade before Dadonov disputed its validity. On 23 March, the trade was officially voided. The controversy lead to the NHL announcing plans to change how no-trade clauses were handled in the future.

Dadonov's profile was elevated as a result of the events, and days after the resolution he scored the overtime-winning goal in a March 26 game against the Chicago Blackhawks, receiving strong applause from the audience. The final two months of the season were Dadonov's strongest, and he finished with 20 goals and 23 assists. It was widely expected, however, that the Golden Knights would again attempt to trade Dadonov in the offseason.

Montreal Canadiens and Dallas Stars
Following the Golden Knights missing the postseason for the first time in franchise history, Dadonov was traded to the Montreal Canadiens in exchange for Shea Weber on 16 June 2022. In the final year of his contract, Dadonov began the 2022–23 season in a top-six offensive role however was unable to replicate his previous offensive totals. In 50 regular season games, he registered only 4 goals and 18 points.

On 26 February 2023, Dadonov was traded by the Canadiens, with half his salary retained, to the Dallas Stars in exchange for fellow struggling Russian, Denis Gurianov.

Career statistics

Regular season and playoffs

International

Awards and honors

References

External links
 
 Evgeny Dadonov at RussianProspects.com

1989 births
Living people
Charlotte Checkers (2010–) players
Dallas Stars players
HC Donbass players
Florida Panthers draft picks
Florida Panthers players
Montreal Canadiens players
Ottawa Senators players
Rochester Americans players
Russian expatriate ice hockey people
Russian expatriate sportspeople in the United States
Russian ice hockey right wingers
San Antonio Rampage players
SKA Saint Petersburg players
Sportspeople from Chelyabinsk
Traktor Chelyabinsk players
Vegas Golden Knights players